Manikanda is a 2007 Indian Tamil-language action film directed by Selva. Arjun plays a dual role, that of father and son. The film, which began production in 2002, went through more production, and was finally released in 2007, was promoted as Jyothika's "last release". It is a remake of the 2000 Telugu movie Jayam Manadera. Manikanda was opened to negative reviews.

Plot

Raja lives in Mumbai with his father. Mahalakshmi goes to Bombay to get the blessings of a godwoman but since she is unable to meet Mataji immediately, she is forced to stay in Mumbai for ten days and rents a guestroom among the many run by Raja. Love blossoms between Raja and Maha and when she returns to her village Maniyoor, he follows a few days later on her invitation. After he lands there, he discovers his own link to the village.

Cast

Arjun as Manikandan/Raja (dual role)
Jyothika as Mahalakshmi (Maha)
Uma as Lakshmi Manikandan
Vadivelu as Madhayaanai
Ashish Vidyarthi as Balasingam
Chandrasekhar as Veerasamy
Nalini as Mahalakshmi's mother
P. Vasu as Mahalakshmi's grandfather
Pasupathy
Malavika
Poovilangu Mohan
Periya Karuppu Thevar
Madhan Bob
Aryan
Singamuthu
Thennavan
Bonda Mani
Halwa Vasu
Priyanka as Maha's friend 
Jeeva
O. A. K. Sundar
Satya Prakash
Vijay Ganesh
Chelladurai
Nellai Siva
Kovai Senthil

Production
Selva who earlier directed Karnaa (1995) with Arjun announced the project in mid-2003. Jyothika was selected to play the lead role uniting with Arjun for second time after Rhythm (2000). P. Vasu, Pasupathi, Ashish Vidyarthi were selected to play villains. There were rumours that film's title would be changed as Nanba but later proved untrue. The film's story happens in a village called Keeripatti where elections were never held for so many years. M.G.R's hit song "Mama Mama" has been remixed in this film. Due to financial crisis the film was shelved for sometime and Selva and Arjun went on to do Aanai (2005). During the time, Selva shelved other projects like Mamu (with Sathyaraj and Sibiraj) and Thotta (2008) (with Jeevan and Priyamani which he later continued) and finished Nenjil (2006) with Navdeep. Project was restarted in 2006 with a change of storyline and it was finally completed.

Release
The satellite rights of the film were sold to Raj TV.

Critical reception
The Hindu wrote: "looks outdated". Cinefundas wrote:"The scenes are disjointed, have many loose ends, and lack uniformity and a smooth flow. It's only towards the end that it perks up".

Soundtrack

Soundtrack was composed by Deva, with lyrics written by Piraisoodan, Na. Muthukumar and Kabilan.

References

External links
 still photos
 trailer

2007 films
Films scored by Deva (composer)
2000s Tamil-language films
Films set in Mumbai
Films shot in Mumbai
Indian action drama films
2000s masala films
Tamil remakes of Telugu films
Films directed by Selva (director)
2007 action drama films